Yitzhak Ben-Zvi ( Yitshak Ben-Tsvi; 24 November 188423 April 1963) was a historian, Labor Zionist leader and the longest-serving President of Israel.

Biography

Born in Poltava in the Russian Empire (today in Ukraine), Ben-Zvi was the eldest son of Zvi Shimshelevich, who later took the name Shimshi. As a member of the B'ne Moshe and Hovevei Zion movements in Ukraine, Zvi Shimshelevich was one of the organizers of the first Zionist Congress in Basel, Switzerland, in the fall of 1897, together with Theodor Herzl. At that Congress the World Zionist Organization was founded, and the intention to re-establish a Jewish state was announced. Shimshi was the only organizer of the first Zionist Congress to live to see the birth of the modern State of Israel in 1948. On 10 December 1952, Zvi Shimshi was honored by the first Israeli Knesset (parliament) with the title "Father of the State of Israel".

Yitzhak Ben-Zvi's parents were banished to Siberia following the discovery of a cache of weapons he had concealed in their home.

Ben-Zvi's brother was author Aharon Reuveni, and his brother-in-law was the Israeli archaeologist Benjamin Mazar.

Ben Zvi had a formal Jewish education at a Poltava heder and then the local Gymnasium.  
He completed his first year at Kiev University studying natural sciences before dropping out to dedicate himself to the newly formed Russian Poale Zion which he co-founded with Ber Borochov.

In 1918, Ben-Zvi married Rachel Yanait a fellow Poale Zion activist. They had two sons: Amram and Eli. Eli died in the 1948 Arab–Israeli War, defending his kibbutz, Beit Keshet.

Zionist activism
Following Borochov's arrest, March 1906, and subsequence exile in the United States, Ben Zvi became leader of the Russian Poale Zion. He moved their headquarters from Poltava to Vilna and established a publishing house, the Hammer, which produced the party's paper, The Proletarian Idea. In April 1907, having been arrested twice and being under surveillance by the Tzarist secret police, Ben-Zvi made Aliyah. He traveled on forged papers. It was his second visit to Palestine. On his arrival in Jaffa he changed his name to Ben Zvi - Son of Zvi. He found the local Poale Zion divided and in disarray. Slightly older and more experienced than his comrades he took command and, the following month, organised a gathering of around 80 members. He and a Rostovian - a strict Marxist group from Rostov - were elected as the new Central Committee. Two of the party's founding principles were reversed : Yiddish, not Hebrew was to be the language used and the Jewish and the Arab proletariat should unite. It was agreed to publish a party journal in Yiddish - Der Anfang. The conference also voted that Ben Zvi and Israel Shochat should attend the 8th World Zionist Congress in The Hague. Once there they were generally ignored. They ran out of money on their return journey and had to work as porters in Trieste. Back in Jaffa they held another gathering, 28 September 1907, to report on the Hague conference. On the first evening of the conference a group of nine men met in Ben Zvi's room where, swearing themselves to secrecy with Shochat as their leader, they agreed to set up an underground military organisation - Bar-Giora, named after Simon Bar Giora. It's slogan was: " Judea fell in blood and fire; Judea shall rise again in blood and fire". David Ben-Gurion was not invited to join and it had been his policies which were overturned in April. Despite this Ben Zvi tried unsuccessfully to invite Ben Gurion onto the Central Committee.
The following year Ben Zvi was one of the founding members of Hashomer.

In spring of 1910 Poale Zion (Palestine) decided to launch a Socialist Hebrew language periodical in Jerusalem. It was called Ha'ahdut and Ben Zvi persuaded Ben Gurion to join as proof reader and translator. The Haredi community in Jerusalem refused to rent them rooms.
At the Poale Zion conference held in April 1911, Ben Zvi announced his plan to move to Constantinople to study Ottoman law. By the following year many of the second Aliyah activists had gathered in the Ottoman capital, with Shochat, Ben Gurion, Moshe Sharret, David Remez, Golda Lishansky, Manya Wilbushewitch and Joseph Trumpeldor all there. As Poale Zion's leading theoretician in 1912 he published a two part essay arguing that in certain circumstances Jewish national interests must take precedence over class solidarity and that Arab labourers should be excluded from Moshavot and the Jewish sector.

In 1915, despite calling on Jews to become Ottoman citizens and attempting to assemble a militia in Jerusalem to fight on the Ottoman side in the First World War, both Ben Zvi and Ben Gurion were expelled to Egypt. From there they travelled to New York where they arrived wearing their tarboushes. In America they set about recruiting members of Paole Zion to fight on the Ottoman side. When this failed he and Ben Gurion embarked on educating Paole Zion followers on the settlement projects in Palestine. This resulted in the publication of Eretz Israel - Past and Present (1918) which ran to several editions, selling 25,000 copies. Initially Ben Zvi was to be co-editor but Ben Gurion ended up dominating all aspects and despite writing about a third Ben Zvi got little recognition.

On returning to Palestine he married Golda Lishansky who had remained in the country throughout the war.

In 1919 he was one of the founders of Ahdut Ha'Avoda which he helped reshape as a non-Marxist, Social Democratic party, which joined the bourgeois World Zionist Organization rather than the Communist International. With his knowledge of the Arabic language Ben Zvi was in charge of policy towards the Arabs. In 1921 he published an essay, on Palestinian Arab Nationalism in which he argued that there was no true Arab liberation movement but an attempt by the elite, Effendi, class to retain power, that it had no popular support and that Zionism was good for the Palestinian peasants (Fellahin). He was head of the Poale Zion's Arab labor department, despite this he opposed a 1922 railway strike by Arab and Jewish workers in Haifa, and in 1923 he blocked a strike threatened by Arab workers in Jaffa and Lydda. Between 1925 and 1928 he produced an Arabic language Zionist weekly newspaper called al-'Umma (Workers Unity).
In 1926 Ahdut Ha'avoda decided to cease all efforts at unionising Arab workers and that Arabs should be barred from joining the newly formed Histadrut.

In 1931 he became chair of Va'ad Leumi.

Ben-Zvi served in the Jewish Legion (1st Judean battalion 'KADIMAH') together with Ben-Gurion. He helped found the Ahdut HaAvoda party in 1919, and became increasingly active in the Haganah. According to Avraham Tehomi, Ben-Zvi ordered the 1924 murder of Jacob Israël de Haan.
De Haan had come to Palestine as an ardent Zionist, but he had become increasingly critical of the Zionist organizations, preferring a negotiated solution to the armed struggle between the Jews and Arabs. This is how Tehomi acknowledged his own part in the murder over sixty years later, in an Israeli television interview in 1985: "I have done what the Haganah decided had to be done. And nothing was done without the order of Yitzhak Ben-Zvi. I have no regrets because he [de Haan] wanted to destroy our whole idea of Zionism."

Political career
Ben Zvi was elected to the Jerusalem City Council and by 1931 served as president of the Jewish National Council, the shadow government of the Jewish community in Mandatory Palestine. When Israel gained its independence, Ben-Zvi was among the signers of its Declaration of Independence on 14 May 1948. He served in the First and Second Knessets for the Mapai party. In 1951, Ben-Zvi was appointed one of the acting members of the Government Naming Committee, whose duty was to decide on appropriate names for newly constructed settlements.

Pedagogic and research career
In Jaffa Ben Zvi found work as a teacher. In 1909, he organized the Gymnasia Rehavia high school in the Bukharim quarter of Jerusalem together with Rachel Yanait.

In 1948, Ben-Zvi headed the Institute for the Study of Oriental Jewish Communities in the Middle East, later named the Ben-Zvi Institute (Yad Ben-Zvi) in his honor. The Ben-Zvi Institute occupies Nissim Valero's house. His main field of research was the Jewish communities and sects of Asia and Africa, including the Samaritans and Karaites.

Presidency

He was elected President of Israel on 8 December 1952, assumed office on 16 December 1952, and continued to serve in the position until his death.

Ben-Zvi believed that the president should set an example for the public, and that his home should reflect the austerity of the times. For over 26 years, he and his family lived in a wooden hut in the Rehavia neighborhood of Jerusalem. The State of Israel took interest in the adjacent house, built and owned by Nissim and Esther Valero, and purchased it, after Nissim's death, to provide additional space for the President's residence. Two larger wooden structures in the yard were used for official receptions.

Awards and recognition
In 1953, Ben-Zvi was awarded the Bialik Prize for Jewish thought.

Ben-Zvi's photo appears on 100 NIS bills. Many streets and boulevards in Israel are named for him. In 2008, Ben-Zvi's wooden hut was moved to Kibbutz Beit Keshet, which his son helped to found, and the interior was restored with its original furnishings. The Valero house in Rehavia neighbourhood was designated an historic building protected by law under municipal plan 2007 for the preservation of historic sites.

Published works
 Coming Home, translated from Hebrew by David Harris and Julian Metzer, Tel Aviv, 1963
  Derakhai Siparti, (Jerusalem, 1971)

Gallery

See also
List of Bialik Prize recipients

References

External links

 Yitzhak Ben-Zvi Israel Ministry of Foreign Affairs
 
 Jewish virtual library entry

1884 births
1963 deaths
Presidents of Israel
20th-century Israeli historians
Jewish historians
Jewish socialists
Members of the Assembly of Representatives (Mandatory Palestine)
Signatories of the Israeli Declaration of Independence
Galatasaray High School alumni
Darülfünun alumni
Istanbul University Faculty of Law alumni
Emigrants from the Russian Empire to the Ottoman Empire
Israeli Ashkenazi Jews
Jews from the Russian Empire
Ukrainian Jews
Royal Fusiliers soldiers
Israeli people of Ukrainian-Jewish descent
Politicians from Poltava
People from Poltava Governorate
Jewish National Council members
Poale Zion politicians
Mapai politicians
Burials at Har HaMenuchot
Heads of the Jewish Agency for Israel
Members of the 1st Knesset (1949–1951)
Members of the 2nd Knesset (1951–1955)
Jewish Legion
Ahdut HaAvoda politicians